Gaetano Monachello (born 3 March 1994) is an Italian footballer who plays as a striker for Mantova.

Club career
Monachello was called up for the squad in Allievi Nazionali U-17 team and also participated in The 2011 Granatkin Memorial in Moscow which took place from 3 to 9 January 2011

In March 2012, he signed a contract with SC Tavriya, which was confirmed in June 2012. But two weeks later, in July 2012 it was announced that his club would be FC Metalurh Donetsk of the Ukrainian Premier League.

In January 2013, Monachello left Metalurh Donetsk for Olympiakos Nicosia on a free transfer signing for six months.

Monachello then transferred to AS Monaco in June 2013. Two months later it was announced that he would play on loan for Monaco's Belgian partner football club Cercle Brugge until the end of the 2013–14 football season. He made his debut on 10 August 2013, coming on as a substitute in the 57th minutes, as Cercle Brugge and Lierse drew 1–1. His first goal came on 5 October 2013, when he scored the club's first goal game before setting up the second in a 2–1 win over Mechelen. He mostly came on as a substitute in the second half, as his minutes significantly decreased. After five months at the club, his loan spell with Cercle Brugge ended.

Monachello signed for Atalanta on 23 July 2015.

Monachello signed for US Palermo on 31 August 2017.

On 15 January 2020, his loan to Pordenone was terminated early. On the same day, he was loaned to Venezia.

On 3 October 2020, he moved to Serie C club Modena on a permanent basis.

On 25 January 2022, he was transferred to Serie C club Mantova on a permanent basis.

International career
He made his debut with the Italy U21 team on 8 September 2015, in a qualification march against Slovenia.

References

External links
 
iltalentocheverra.it 

1994 births
Living people
People from Agrigento
Footballers from Sicily
Association football forwards
Italian footballers
Italy under-21 international footballers
Italy youth international footballers
Italian expatriate footballers
Inter Milan players
FC Metalurh Donetsk players
Olympiakos Nicosia players
AS Monaco FC players
Cercle Brugge K.S.V. players
Ergotelis F.C. players
S.S. Virtus Lanciano 1924 players
Atalanta B.C. players
S.S.C. Bari players
Palermo F.C. players
Ascoli Calcio 1898 F.C. players
Venezia F.C. players
Modena F.C. players
Mantova 1911 players
Ukrainian Premier League players
Cypriot First Division players
Belgian Pro League players
Super League Greece players
Serie A players
Serie B players
Serie C players
Italian expatriate sportspeople in Ukraine
Italian expatriate sportspeople in Cyprus
Italian expatriate sportspeople in Monaco
Italian expatriate sportspeople in Belgium
Italian expatriate sportspeople in Greece
Expatriate footballers in Ukraine
Expatriate footballers in Cyprus
Expatriate footballers in Monaco
Expatriate footballers in Belgium
Expatriate footballers in Greece
Sportspeople from the Province of Agrigento